Warren is the traditional name for the largest settlement in the civil parish of Gawsworth in Cheshire, England. Nowadays the name is seldom used, the inhabitants usually saying that they live in Gawsworth.

References

Villages in Cheshire